Saharan montane or Saharo-montane xeric woodlands can refer to:

 East Saharan montane xeric woodlands
 West Saharan montane xeric woodlands
 Tibesti-Jebel Uweinat montane xeric woodlands 
 the above regions in aggregate